The Triumph of Venus is a 1740 oil-on-canvas painting by François Boucher. It inspired The Birth of Venus by Jean-Honoré Fragonard.

The painting was one of the large number of drawings and paintings acquired by Carl Gustaf Tessin during his stay in Paris, but he had to sell it off part of his collection to the king of Sweden in 1749 after he experienced financial troubles. The painting is now in the Nationalmuseum in Stockholm.

References

Mythological paintings by François Boucher
1740 paintings
Paintings in the collection of the Nationalmuseum Stockholm
Nude art
Paintings of Venus
Bathing in art